The 1931–32 Hong Kong First Division League season was the 24th since its establishment.

Overview
Royal Navy won the title.

References
RSSSF

1931–32 in Asian association football leagues
Hong Kong First Division League seasons
3